Aethes fennicana is a species of moth of the family Tortricidae. It is found in northern and central Europe, Iran and China (Xinjiang).

Adults are on wing from July to August.

References

fennicana
Moths described in 1924
Moths of Europe
Moths of Asia